was a Japanese right-wing ultranationalist youth who assassinated Inejirō Asanuma, chairman of the Japan Socialist Party, on 12 October 1960. Yamaguchi rushed the stage and stabbed Asanuma with a wakizashi short sword while Asanuma was participating in a televised election debate at Hibiya Public Hall in Tokyo. Yamaguchi, who was 17 years of age at the time, had been a member of Bin Akao's far-right Greater Japan Patriotic Party, but had resigned earlier that year. After being arrested and interrogated, Yamaguchi committed suicide while in a detention facility.

Yamaguchi became a hero and a martyr to the Japanese far-right, and commemorations in his honor continue to this day. Yamaguchi's actions inspired a number of copycat crimes, including the Shimanaka incident in 1961, and inspired Nobel Prize-winning novelist Kenzaburō Ōe's novellas Seventeen and Death of a Political Youth. A photograph of the Asanuma assassination taken by Japanese photojournalist Yasushi Nagao won World Press Photo of the Year for 1960 and the 1961 Pulitzer Prize.

Early life
Yamaguchi was born on 22 February 1943 in Yanaka, Taitō ward, Tokyo. He was the second son of  Shinpei Yamaguchi, who by 1960 would become a high-ranking officer in the Japan Ground Self-Defense Force, and was the maternal grandson of the famous writer Namiroku Murakami, well known for his violent novels glorifying the chivalric code of Japanese organized crime syndicates known as the yakuza. Yamaguchi began reading newspapers starting in his early childhood. Angered by what he read, he became interested in nationalist movements and vehemently critical of politicians. Through his brother's influence, he began attending speeches and participating in protests and counter-protests organized by various right-wing groups. At age 16, he formally joined prominent right-wing ultranationalist Bin Akao's Greater Japan Patriotic Party (大日本愛国党, Dai Nippon Aikokutō).

1960 Anpo protests
Akao was virulently anti-communist and strongly pro-United States. Thus when left-wing protesters, led by Asanuma and the Japan Socialist Party, staged the massive Anpo protests against the 1960 revision of the U.S.-Japan Security Treaty (known as "Anpo" in Japanese), Akao became convinced that Japan was on the verge of a communist revolution and mobilized his followers to stage counter-protests. Yamaguchi participated in these counter-protest activities, and was arrested and released 10 times over the course of 1959 and 1960.

Over the course of his participation in the Anpo protests, Yamaguchi became further disillusioned with Akao's leadership, which he felt was not radical enough. In his testimony to the police after the assassination of Asanuma, Yamaguchi stated that Akao was always talking about taking out left-wing leaders, but was only interested in protests and media coverage, and that Akao would stop him if he ever tried to act on his words. Later in the interview, he stated that he had resigned from Akao's party in order to "lay [his] hands on a weapon" and be free to take more "decisive action."

Assassination of Inejirō Asanuma

On 12 October 1960, Yamaguchi was in the large crowd of 2,500 spectators at a televised election debate held in Hibiya Public Hall in Hibiya Park in central Tokyo, featuring Suehiro Nishio of the Democratic Socialist Party, Inejirō Asanuma of the Japan Socialist Party, and Hayato Ikeda of the Liberal Democratic Party. Asanuma was the second to speak, and took the stage at 3:00 p.m.

At 3:05 p.m., Yamaguchi rushed onto the stage and made a deep thrust into Asanuma's left flank with a 33-centimetre samurai short sword (wakizashi) he had stolen from his father. Yamaguchi then tried to turn the sword on himself, but was swarmed and detained by bystanders. Asanuma died within minutes from massive internal bleeding.

At the time of the murder, Yamaguchi had a note in his pocket that read:

Imprisonment and suicide
 Following the assassination, Yamaguchi was arrested and imprisoned awaiting trial. Throughout his imprisonment, Yamaguchi remained calm and composed and freely gave extensive testimony to police. Yamaguchi consistently asserted that he had acted alone and without any direction from others. Less than three weeks after the assassination, on 2 November, Yamaguchi mixed a small amount of toothpaste with water and wrote on his cell wall, “Long live the Emperor” (天皇陛下万才, tennōheika banzai) and “Would that I had seven lives to give for my country” (七生報国, shichishō hōkoku), the latter a reference to the famous last words of fourteenth-century samurai Kusunoki Masashige. Yamaguchi then knotted strips of his bedsheet into a makeshift rope and used it to hang himself from a light fixture.

Right-wing groups celebrated Yamaguchi as a martyr; they gave a burial coat, kimono, and belt to his parents and performed a memorial service for him. His ashes were interred in Aoyama Cemetery.

Legacy

A photograph taken by Yasushi Nagao immediately after Yamaguchi withdrew his sword from Asanuma won the 1961 Pulitzer Prize, and the 1960 World Press Photo award. Footage of the incident was also captured.

On 15 December 1960, just weeks after Yamaguchi's suicide, a nationwide coalition of Japanese right-wing groups held a "National Memorial Service for Our Martyred Brother Yamaguchi Otoya" in the same Hibya Public Hall in Tokyo where Yamaguchi had assassinated Asanuma. Since then, right-wing groups have held an annual commemoration of Yamaguchi's death anniversary each year on 2 November. In October 2010, right-wing groups staged a large-scale celebration of the 50th anniversary of Yamaguchi's assassination of Asanuma in Hibiya Park.

Yamaguchi's actions and the massive publicity they received inspired a rash of copycat crimes, as a number of political figures became targets of assassination plots and attempts over the next few years. Of the notable crimes inspired by Yamaguchi's attack one was the Shimanaka Incident. On 1 February 1961, then 17-year-old member of the Greater Japan Patriotic Party Kazutaka Komori, attempted to assassinate the president of Chūō Kōron magazine for publishing a graphic dream sequence depicting the beheading of the emperor and his family. This played a role in establishing what came to be known as the Chrysanthemum taboo.

Japanese author Kenzaburō Ōe based his 1961 novellas Seventeen and Death of a Political Youth on Yamaguchi.

Notes

References

Further reading

1943 births
1960 suicides
20th-century criminals
People from Tokyo
Japanese anti-communists
Japanese assassins
Japanese nationalists
Minors convicted of murder
Suicides by hanging in Japan
Japanese people who died in prison custody
Prisoners who died in Japanese detention
Murderers who committed suicide in prison custody
People notable for being the subject of a specific photograph
Far-right politics in Japan
1960 murders in Japan
Burials in Japan